Kee Chang Huang (July 22, 1917 in Canton, China – November 25, 1998) was a Distinguished Professor at the University of Louisville.

He attended Sun Yat-sen University, receiving his medical degree in 1940. He was a research fellow in pharmacology at the Chinese National Institute of Health for six years before joining the faculty of the National Shanghai Medical School in 1946. In 1949, he left China to enter graduate school at the Columbia University College of Physicians and Surgeons. After receiving a Ph.D. in physiology in 1953, he was recruited by the University of Louisville as a Research Associate in Pharmacology, rising through the ranks to become Professor of Pharmacology in 1963. During his tenure he was awarded the Fulbright Professorship twice and the Distinguished Professorship by the University of Louisville and the Tianjim Medical College of China.

He is the author of three books, Absorption, Distribution, Transformation and Excretion of Drugs, Outline of Pharmacology, and The Pharmacology of Chinese Herbs, and many research papers. He retired from the university in 1989, but remained active in research.

References

External links 
 Kee Chang Huang - University of Louisville
 Brazil, Rio de Janeiro, Immigration Cards, 1900-1965

1917 births
1998 deaths
Chinese pharmacologists
Chinese medical academics
National Sun Yat-sen University alumni
Chinese emigrants to the United States